Buffalo Bill Rides Again is a 1947 American Western film starring Richard Arlen. It was also known as Return of Buffalo Bill.

Cast
Richard Arlen as Buffalo Bill
Jennifer Holt as Dale Harrington
Lee Shumway as Steve Harrington
John Dexter as Tom Russell

Production
The film was the first produced by Jack Schwarz under a three-year contract with Screen Guild Productions. It was meant to result in 12 films.

References

External links

1947 films
American Western (genre) films
Films directed by Bernard B. Ray
Lippert Pictures films
1947 Western (genre) films
American black-and-white films
1940s English-language films
1940s American films